The following is a list of Michigan State Historic Sites in Dickinson County, Michigan. Sites marked with a dagger (†) are also listed on the National Register of Historic Places in Dickinson County, Michigan.


Current listings

See also
 National Register of Historic Places listings in Dickinson County, Michigan

Sources
 Historic Sites Online – Dickinson County. Michigan State Housing Developmental Authority. Accessed January 23, 2011.

References

Dickinson County
State Historic Sites
Tourist attractions in Dickinson County, Michigan